The 1996 Big East Conference baseball tournament was held at Senator Thomas J. Dodd Memorial Stadium in Norwich, Connecticut. This was the twelfth annual Big East Conference baseball tournament. The  won their only tournament championship in their first year in the league, and claimed the Big East Conference's automatic bid to the 1996 NCAA Division I baseball tournament. West Virginia joined the Big 12 Conference after the 2012 season.

Format and seeding 
The Big East baseball tournament was a 6 team double elimination tournament in 1996. The top three regular season finishers in each division were seeded one through three based on conference winning percentage only. West Virginia claimed the top seed from the American Division by winning the season series over Providence. The top team in each division played the third seed from the opposite division and the second seeds played each other in the first round. This was the first season of divisional play, resulting from the addition of Notre Dame, Rutgers and West Virginia to the league beginning with the 1996 season.

Bracket

Jack Kaiser Award 
Chris Enochs was the winner of the 1996 Jack Kaiser Award. Enochs was a pitcher for West Virginia.

References 

Tournament
Big East Conference Baseball Tournament
Big East Conference baseball tournament
Big East Conference baseball tournament
College baseball tournaments in Connecticut
Norwich, Connecticut